Pivaldehyde is an organic compound, more specifically an aldehyde. Shown in the image is a line-angle representation of this organic aldehyde, whose systematic name, 2,2-dimethylpropanal, is based on the longest carbon chain (three carbon atoms), ending in "-al" to indicate the aldehyde functionality, and where another descriptive synonym is trimethylacetaldehyde. Pivaldehyde is an example of an aldehyde with a sterically bulky R group, the tertiary-butyl group (with 3 methyl groups, at lower left in the image), attached to the carbonyl, >C=O. By definition, the other "group", R', is a hydrogen (H) atom, shown here pointing directly upward.

See also
Pivalic acid - corresponding carboxylic acid
Pivalamide - corresponding amide
Pinacolone - corresponding methyl ketone

References

Alkanals
Tert-butyl compounds